Mail Order Bride is a 2008 American Western television film on the Hallmark Channel. It premiered on November 8, 2008, and stars Daphne Zuniga.

Plot
Con-woman Diana McQueen decides to skip out of town and leave her boss, Tom Rourke, behind. To avoid the conflict that would result by her quick disappearance, she switches places with a dying friend, who had planned on becoming a man's mail-order bride. Seeing that this is her only chance to escape, she takes on the role and lies to the unsuspecting frontiersman.

Cast
 Daphne Zuniga as Diana McQueen
 Greg Evigan as Tom Rourke
 Cameron Bancroft as Beau Canfield
 Tom Heaton as Willy
 Katharine Isabelle as Jen

Reception
Mail Order Bride ranked as the network's most-watched November non-holiday original movie ever. The movie scored a 2.2 household rating, delivered nearly 1.9 million homes, 2.5 million total viewers and 3.9 million unduplicated viewers. It also ranked as the second-highest-rated cable movie of the day and fourth-highest-rated movie of the week. This performance boosted Hallmark Channel to rank #2 in Prime Time for the day, and #10 for the week.

References

External links
 
 Mail Order Bride at Hallmark Channel

2008 television films
2008 films
2008 Western (genre) films
Films about weddings
Hallmark Channel original films
American Western (genre) television films
2000s English-language films